Man Machine Poem is the thirteenth studio album by Canadian rock band the Tragically Hip, and the last album to be released before the death of lead singer Gord Downie, as well as their last to be composed of new material. It was released on June 17, 2016 on Universal Music Canada. Produced by Kevin Drew and Dave Hamelin, the album is named after a track which appeared on the band's previous album Now for Plan A.

The album's first single, "In a World Possessed by the Human Mind", was released in April.

Prior to the album's release, the band announced that Gord Downie was diagnosed with brain cancer in December 2015 and that the band would tour Canada in summer 2016 to support the album. The band and critics have cautioned, however, against interpreting the album in light of Downie's health, as it was written and recorded before his diagnosis. Although some media coverage has referred to it as the band's final album, the band reportedly worked on some new studio material after its release, and also have more than one album's worth of previously unreleased material that could be issued in the future as rarities compilations.

Background

The album had been slated for release in March 2016 under the title Dougie Stardust, as a play on David Bowie's classic album The Rise and Fall of Ziggy Stardust and the Spiders from Mars; it had even begun appearing on music retail sites as a pre-order under that title. The band delayed the album's release after Downie suffered his second cancer-related seizure in February, and opted to retitle it in light of Bowie's death in January.

Critical reception
Writing in Exclaim!, Stuart Henderson described the album as "a darkly illuminated, late-career curveball likely to please and confound in equal measure. Rarely since their mid-1990s heyday has the multi-platinum-selling band sounded so intent on crafting something different." In the Edmonton Journal, Fish Griwkowsky described the album as "a deep-felt, summer highway album that briefly escapes the weight of the doom we all share — not alone, but together in the dark".

The album garnered a longlist nomination for the 2017 Polaris Music Prize, and won the Juno Award for Rock Album of the Year at the Juno Awards of 2017.

Track listing
All tracks written by Gord Downie and the Tragically Hip.

Charts

Weekly charts

Year-end charts

References

2016 albums
The Tragically Hip albums
Juno Award for Rock Album of the Year albums
Albums produced by Kevin Drew
Songs about diseases and disorders